Habang Kapiling Ka  (International title: With You / ) is a Philippine television drama romance series broadcast by GMA Network. Directed by Maryo J. de los Reyes, it stars Angelika dela Cruz. It premiered on November 4, 2002 on the network's Telebabad line up replacing Ikaw Lang ang Mamahalin. The series concluded on October 17, 2003 with a total of 248 episodes. It was replaced by Twin Hearts in its timeslot.

Cast and characters

Lead cast
 Angelika dela Cruz as Erica Malvarosa
 Victor Neri as Julius Javellana

Supporting cast
 Albert Martinez as Alejandro Javellana
 Snooky Serna as Olivia Malvarosa
 Tonton Gutierrez as Marius Malvarosa / Xandro / Kenji Ogata
 Richard Gutierrez as Basilio Malvarosa
 Chynna Ortaleza as Donna Javellana-Capistrano
 Toni Gonzaga as Emillie Capistrano-Bravo
 Railey Valeroso as Pierre Paolo Capistrano-Bravo
 Chin Chin Gutierrez as Helga Lamermoore
 Ruffa Gutierrez as Venus Paraiso
 Alma Moreno as Salve Capistrano
 Zoren Legaspi as Jonas Capistrano
 Amy Perez as Divine Ogata
 Yul Servo as Nonoy Bautista
 Jaime Fabregas as Fausto Bravo
 Aleck Bovick as Liway
 Tootsie Guevara as Bunny Bravo

Guest cast
 Divine Tetay
 Patricia Ismael
 Long Mejia as Badong
 Jake Roxas as Ludwig
 Hans Montenegro as Lino
 Nonie Buencamino as Javier
 Camille Roxas as Medea
 Andrea del Rosario as Nanette
 Lloyd Samartino as Milton
 Sheree Bautista as Magnolia
 Rosette Cancino as young Emilie
 Cheng Luciano as young Erika
 Johnjohn Castro as young Julius
 Lorenzo Hemulgada as young Pierre Paolo
 Kitchie Nadal as Kimmie
 Manny Pacquiao as himself
 Jinkee Pacquiao as herself

Accolades

References

External links
 

2002 Philippine television series debuts
2003 Philippine television series endings
Filipino-language television shows
GMA Network drama series
Philippine romance television series
Television shows set in the Philippines